Landon Cider (born Kristine Bellaluna) is an American drag king, actor and host. He won season 3 of The Boulet Brothers' Dragula and was crowned the "World's Next Drag Supermonster".

Early life and background 
Kristine Bellaluna was born and raised in Los Angeles, and performs under the name Landon Cider. Bellaluna began her career as a theatre actor in Southern California. She took a hiatus from theatre following the death of her mother, and later became interested in drag after attending drag shows at the Starlette Revue. In an interview with Gay Times, Cider cited male impersonator Vesta Tilley, Australian drag king Sexy Galexy and lesbian icon Stormé DeLarverie as inspirations.

Career 
Landon Cider began his career performing in the Southern California drag circuit, where he became one of the more well known drag kings. He performs Drag King Explosion at Hamburger Mary's. He is the master of ceremonies for the annual Los Angeles event series Bent, which celebrates drag and queer identities.

Cider was the main focus of Nicole Miyahara's 2013 documentary The Making of a King.

Cider began working with World of Wonder in 2016 and appeared on James St. James' Transformations. He later hosted the first King Panel at DragCon. Cider wrote an op-ed for The Advocate, criticizing RuPaul's position that females performing drag does not have the irony that males performing drag does.

In 2019, Cider joined the cast of season 3 of The Boulet Brothers' Dragula, becoming the first drag king to appear on an American drag competition show. He won the season and was crowned the "World's Next Drag Supermonster" by the Boulet Brothers.

Cider was also a judge on Alaska Thunderfuck's "Drag Queen of the Year Pageant" that year. He was listed on Pride Magazine's "11 Drag Kings You Should Definitely Know About".

In February 2020, Cider hosted Pride Union's 18th Annual Drag Show Finals with Manila Luzon.

Landon Cider hosts Socially Distant, a digital drag livestream. The show aired on April 2, 2020, and featured drag artists such as Hugo Grrrl and Charli Deville. He was featured on the HBO reality television show We're Here. Cider appeared in the 2020 book Rainbow Revolutions by Magnus Hastings.

In September 2022, it was announced that Cider would be starring in the Hulu original variety special Huluween Dragstravaganza, which aired on October 1, 2022.

Cider appears as a regular judge in the second season of the Canadian drag competition series Call Me Mother.

Personal life 
Bellaluna is a survivor of oral cancer. She identifies as a lesbian, and has a wife named Gabi.

References 

LGBT people from California
American drag kings
Year of birth missing (living people)
Living people
The Boulet Brothers' Dragula contestants